Chionogenes trimetra is a moth of the  family Yponomeutidae. It is found in Australia.

References

External links
 https://bie.ala.org.au/species/urn:lsid:biodiversity.org.au:afd.taxon:4bd6da4a-344c-441e-b0f1-381e61550dbb#overview

Yponomeutidae
Moths described in 1913